Nicklaus Thomas-Symonds  (born 26 May 1980) is a British academic, barrister and politician who has been Shadow Secretary of State for International Trade since 2021. A member of the Labour Party, he has been Member of Parliament (MP) for Torfaen since 2015.

Thomas-Symonds served as Shadow Home Secretary from 2020 to 2021, and held several junior shadow portfolios from 2015 to 2020. Prior to his election to Parliament, he was a chancery and commercial barrister at Civitas Law. He is also the author of Attlee: A Life in Politics and Nye: The Political Life of Aneurin Bevan.

Early life and education
Thomas-Symonds was born in Panteg Hospital, Griffithstown, Torfaen, and was brought up in Blaenavon. His father was a steelworker and industrial chemist, and his mother was a secretary. He attended St Felix R.C. Primary School, Blaenavon, and St Alban's R.C. High School, Pontypool. He then studied Philosophy, Politics and Economics at St Edmund Hall, Oxford, between 1998 and 2001, where he gained a first.

Career

Legal career
Thomas-Symonds was called to the bar by Lincoln's Inn in October 2004 and developed a practice specialising in chancery and commercial law.

Academic career
Thomas-Symonds was appointed a tutor at St Edmund Hall, Oxford at the age of 21. He was later a lecturer in politics at the college, teaching British Politics and Government since 2000; Modern British Government and Politics; Government and Politics of Europe; and Government and Politics of the United States. Thomas-Symonds taught for other Oxford colleges, including Harris Manchester College. He also taught US Politics on the Oxford Department of Continuing Education's "Foundations of Diplomacy" course.  Between 2008 and 2009, he was the politics tutor of former White House Press Secretary Kayleigh McEnany. He was elected a Fellow of the Royal Historical Society in 2012.

Thomas-Symonds has published two political biographies: Nye: The Political Life of Aneurin Bevan and Attlee: A Life in Politics.

On 1 September 2022, Thomas-Symonds published his third political biography, Harold Wilson: the Winner.

Political career
Thomas-Symonds was selected as prospective Labour parliamentary candidate for his home seat of Torfaen on 7 March 2015 and subsequently won the seat in the general election on 7 May 2015. He made his maiden speech on 28 May 2015.

After a brief stint on the Justice Select Committee, he was appointed Shadow Pensions Minister on 17 September 2015 before being promoted to Shadow Employment Minister on 11 January 2016. He resigned the role of Shadow Employment Minister on 27 June 2016, later supporting Owen Smith in the 2016 Labour Party leadership election.

Thomas-Symonds accepted the position of Shadow Solicitor General on 11 October 2016, and on 3 July 2017 he was appointed as Shadow Security Minister within the Shadow Home Affairs Team.

In his role as Shadow Solicitor General, Thomas-Symonds faced the Attorney General and Solicitor General in the House of Commons throughout the Brexit crisis, in place of the then Shadow Attorney General, Baroness Shami Chakrabarti, who sat in the House of Lords.

Thomas-Symonds raised the issue of low prosecution rates for rape case during his time in the role.

During the Brexit crisis, Thomas-Symonds regularly clashed with the then Attorney General, Geoffrey Cox, across the despatch box.

In a debate on 3 December 2018, after The Sunday Times newspaper reported leaked excerpts of a recent letter sent by the Attorney General to Cabinet Ministers detailing legal advice on Prime Minister Theresa May's Brexit deal, Thomas-Symonds accused Cox of hiding his full legal advice on May's Brexit deal “for fear of the political consequences", stating that the government was "playing for time, hoping that the contempt proceedings take longer than the timetable for the meaningful vote". Thomas-Symonds made an application to the Speaker for Parliament to consider holding the Government in contempt of Parliament. The next day, 4 December, the Government was found in contempt of Parliament.

On 24 September 2019, the Supreme Court of the United Kingdom ruled unanimously that Prime Minister Boris Johnson's prorogation of parliament was unlawful overturning the High Court's judgment, given by the Lord Chief Justice, in the government's favour. On the same day, leaked minutes of a conference call between cabinet ministers, including Cox, which took place after the prorogation had been approved by the Queen, detailed that Cox briefly told the cabinet at that time that in his view the prorogation was lawful and constitutional and that any accusations of unlawfulness "were motivated by political considerations". On 25 September 2019, Thomas-Symonds, facing Cox in the House of Commons, said that the Government "stands in shame" given what was "the most damning judicial inditement of a Government in modern times".

Separately, Thomas-Symonds promoted reform of the structure of Bar professional training courses, to open up the profession to people from a range of backgrounds, arguing that in their current form a disproportionate number of places were being offered on courses when compared with the total opportunities for pupillage.

Upon becoming Shadow Security Minister in July 2017, Thomas-Symonds said cybersecurity was one of his top priorities. 

Thomas-Symonds successfully convinced the Government to accept amendments to the Counterterrorism and Border Security Bill that nullified the risk the bill posed to removing the right to private legal advice.

He has served as Chair of four All-Party Parliamentary Groups: Off-Patent Drugs; Industrial Heritage; Legal & Constitutional Affairs; and Archives & History.

Thomas-Symonds was drawn in the ballot for a Private Members' Bill on 4 June 2015, and introduced the Off-Patent Drugs Bill. This ran out of time at Second Reading on 6 November 2015, but substantial parts of the Bill were later incorporated into the Access to Medical Treatments (Innovation) Bill on 29 January 2016. As a result of promises secured by Thomas-Symonds, the British National Formulary has started to include off-label drugs in its new indication where there is sufficient evidence.

On 8 December 2015, Nick Thomas-Symonds was chosen as 'Member to Watch' at the Welsh Politician of the Year Awards.

Shadow Home Secretary 
In April 2020, Thomas-Symonds was appointed as Shadow Home Secretary by Sir Keir Starmer, succeeding Diane Abbott. Amongst his first acts in post, Thomas-Symonds called on the Home Secretary, Rt Hon Priti Patel MP, to provide additional funding for organisations tackling domestic abuse.

During the passage of the Immigration Bill, Thomas-Symonds pressed for the Government to abolish the Immigration Health Surcharge. In a U-Turn, Prime Minister Boris Johnson agreed to abolish it for health workers in May 2020.

After the murder of George Floyd on 25 May 2020, Thomas-Symonds urged the Prime Minister to "show leadership" in addressing structural racism and inequality.

After the Reading terror attack in June 2020, Thomas-Symonds laid flowers at the scene and called for a judge-led review into lone attackers.

On immigration, Thomas-Symonds argued that the Conservatives lacked compassion and competence.

In his first speech to party conference – the virtual "Labour Connect" of 2020, Thomas-Symonds spoke of Labour's "duty to tackle and prevent crime" and that his role "was to convince people that Labour will keep you, your family and your community safe".

In January 2021, it was revealed that 400,000 pieces of police data has been accidentally deleted from the Police National Computer. Thomas-Symonds said: "You do not make our streets safer by losing such a substantial amount of information about criminal behaviour."

During the Covid pandemic, Thomas-Symonds argued for better protections at the border, including comprehensive hotel quarantining for arrivals in the UK.

On 12 February 2021, it was confirmed that Nick Thomas-Symonds was to be sworn of Her Majesty's Privy Council.

In March 2021, Sarah Everard disappeared after leaving a friend's house near Clapham Common to walk home. In response to the tragedy, and the vigil held on Clapham Common, Thomas-Symonds called for action to end violence against women and girls, putting forward a 10-point plan alongside Labour's Shadow Minister for Domestic Violence and Safeguarding, Jess Phillips MP. Thomas-Symonds also criticised the Government's Police, Crime, Sentencing and Courts Bill, which was at this time being debated in the House of Commons, for provisions which, he said, put protection of statues before the protection of women.

In May 2021, alongside celebrities and other public figures, Thomas-Symonds was a signatory to an open letter from Stylist magazine which called on the government to address what it described as an "epidemic of male violence" by funding an "ongoing, high-profile, expert-informed awareness campaign on men's violence against women and girls".

Shadow International Trade Secretary 
In the November 2021 shadow cabinet reshuffle, he was demoted to Shadow Secretary of State for International Trade.

Thomas-Symonds said it was "crucial that human rights, women's rights and workers' rights are embedded" in the UK trade negotiations. "When negotiating for new opportunities in exchange for our access to our markets, we must seek to promote high standards."  Thomas-Symonds urged action in trade deals to tackle climate change and criticised the UK Government for failing to include an explicit commitment to limiting global warming to 1.5 degrees in the UK-Australia trade deal.

Thomas-Symonds prioritised steel exports in his first intervention, writing to International Trade Secretary Anne-Marie Trevelyan, urging her to negotiate with the United States to the section 232 steel tariffs imposed by President Donald Trump in 2018. A deal was eventually reached on 23 March 2022.

In his first full interview, Nick Thomas-Symonds said that the British public had been promised a US-UK trade deal and that one should be delivered. When Prime Minister Liz Truss confirmed, on 20 September 2022, that there would be no US-UK trade negotiations in the short-to-medium term, Thomas-Symonds said: "The admission that there is no prospect of a trade deal with the USA is terrible news for the economy."

On 3 March 2022, following the Russian invasion of Ukraine, Nick Thomas-Symonds called on the UK to place a total ban on exporting luxury goods to Russia to target the "Mayfair lifestyle" enjoyed by President Putin and his inner circle.

On 2 August 2022, Nick Thomas-Symonds was named as one of the 39 UK personalities banned from entering Russia.

Personal life
Thomas-Symonds is married, and has three children.

Selected works

Articles
  (Researched by Gareth McCann).

References

External links

 Nick Thomas-Symonds CV at Democracy Club

|-

1980 births
Living people
Alumni of St Edmund Hall, Oxford
Welsh Labour Party MPs
UK MPs 2015–2017
UK MPs 2017–2019
UK MPs 2019–present
Fellows of the Royal Historical Society
Members of the Privy Council of the United Kingdom